Oxyphenonium bromide is an antimuscarinic drug.  It is used to treat gastric and duodenal ulcers and to relieve visceral spasms.

References

Muscarinic antagonists
Quaternary ammonium compounds
Bromides
Tertiary alcohols
Carboxylate esters